Cowley is a village in southern Alberta, Canada. It is west of Lethbridge and surrounded by the Municipal District of Pincher Creek No. 9. 

It was settled in the 1880s and named by a rancher. Cowley Post Office opened in 1900, and in 1906 Cowley was incorporated as village. The community's name is a combination of "cow" and "lea".

Demographics 

Arts and culture 
Cowley was featured in the 2005 motion picture Brokeback Mountain as the fictional town of Signal, Wyoming.

Cowley is featured on a 17c postage stamp issued by Canada Post in 1980 (August 27) to mark the 75th anniversary of the creation of the Province of Alberta.

See also 
List of communities in Alberta
List of villages in Alberta

References

External links 

1906 establishments in Alberta
Villages in Alberta